The Canton of Saint-Paul-Trois-Châteaux is a former canton located in the Department of Drôme, in the Arrondissement of Nyons. Its seat (chef-lieu) was the town Saint-Paul-Trois-Châteaux. The canton had 19,749 inhabitants in 2012. It was disbanded following the French canton reorganisation which came into effect in March 2015. It included the following communes:

Bouchet
Clansayes
La Baume-de-Transit
Montségur-sur-Lauzon
Rochegude
Saint-Paul-Trois-Châteaux
Saint-Restitut
Solérieux
Suze-la-Rousse
Tulette

See also
Cantons of the Drôme department

References

Former cantons of Drôme
2015 disestablishments in France
States and territories disestablished in 2015